Georges Million was a French cinematographer. He worked on more than fifty films between 1921 and 1958.

Selected filmography
 Verdun: Visions of History (1928)
 The Mad Night (1932)
 The Call of Silence (1936)
 The Men Without Names (1937)
 The Guardian Angel (1942)
 Malaria (1943)
 The Man Without a Name (1943)
 Special Mission (1946)
 Impeccable Henri (1948)
Judicial Error (1948)
 The Man Who Returns from Afar (1950)
 The Ferret (1950)
 His Father's Portrait (1953)
 Wonderful Mentality (1953)
 The Last Robin Hood (1953)

References

Bibliography
 Powrie, Phil & Rebillard, Éric. Pierre Batcheff and stardom in 1920s French cinema. Edinburgh University Press, 2009.

External links

1898 births
1958 deaths
French cinematographers